Oxana Lyubtsova ( in Melitopol) is a Ukrainian tennis player.

As a professional, her highest career singles ranking is World No. 149, achieved on 21 July 2008, her highest career world doubles ranking is No. 254, achieved on 27 April 2009.

Lyubtsova has won five ITF singles titles and three ITF doubles titles.

Lyubtsova played in her first WTA Tour event when she qualified to play in the 2009 Open GDF Suez. She lost in the first round to the 4th seeded Polish teenager Agnieszka Radwańska 6–1, 6–1. Her highest WTA singles ranking is 141st, which she reached on 21 July 2008.

Career statistics

Singles finals: 10 (5–5)

Doubles finals: 8 (3–5)

References

External links
 
 

Ukrainian female tennis players
1985 births
Living people
People from Melitopol
Sportspeople from Zaporizhzhia Oblast
21st-century Ukrainian women